Hymenia perspectalis, the spotted beet webworm moth, is a species of moth of the family Crambidae. It is found in various parts of the world, including North America, where it is found from Maine to Florida, west to Texas and north to Michigan and Ontario. It is also found in Belize, Hong Kong, Jamaica, Australia (Queensland), the Comoros, Equatorial Guinea, Réunion and South Africa. The species was described by Jacob Hübner in 1796.

The wingspan is 16–22 mm. Adults are cinnamon brown with narrow white bands on the forewings. The hindwings with brownish or greyish-yellow wing bands in some individuals. They are on wing from April to November.

The larvae feed on a wide range of plants, including Beta vulgaris, chard, potatoes, amaranth species and various greenhouse plants. They are green with purple dots on the head. Food plant records for this species also include Althernanthera pungens (Amaranthaceae), Eclipta prostrata, Eleutheranthera ruderalis, Melanthera canescens, Wedelia trilobata (Asteraceae), Amaranthus hibridus, Amaranthus australis (Amaranthaceae) and Rivinia humilis (Phytolacaeae).

References

Spilomelinae
Moths of Africa
Moths of the Comoros
Moths of Réunion
Moths described in 1796
Taxa named by Jacob Hübner